Romans 3 is the third chapter of the Epistle to the Romans in the New Testament of the Christian Bible. It was composed by Paul the Apostle, while he was in Corinth in the mid-50s AD, with the help of an amanuensis (secretary), Tertius, who added his own greeting in Romans 16:22.

In this chapter, Paul asks a series of rhetorical questions in order to develop his theological message, and quotes extensively from the Hebrew Bible. Theologian Albert Barnes suggests that "the design of the first part of this chapter is to answer some of the objections which might be offered by a Jew to the statements in the previous chapter".

Text
The original text was written in Koine Greek. This chapter is divided into 31 verses.

Textual witnesses
Some early manuscripts containing the text of this chapter are:
Papyrus 40 (~AD 250; extant verses 21–31)
Codex Vaticanus (325–350)
Codex Sinaiticus (330–360)
Codex Alexandrinus (400–440)
Codex Ephraemi Rescriptus (~450; extant verses 22–31)

Old Testament references
 Romans 3:4 references Psalm 51:4
 Romans 3:10–12 references Psalm 14:1–3, Psalm 53:1–3 and Ecclesiastes 7:20
 Romans 3:13 references Psalm 5:9 and Psalm 140:3
 Romans 3:14 references Psalm 10:7
 Romans 3:17 references Isaiah 59:7–8
 Romans 3:18 references Psalm 36:1
 Romans 3:20 references Psalm 143:2b

God's righteousness upheld (3:1–7)
In verse 2, the chief advantage, or benefit, or responsibility, or superiority of the Jewish people is their possession of the Hebrew Bible ( New International Version). Traditional translations (the Geneva Bible, King James Version, American Standard Version and Revised Standard Version) refer to the "oracles of God". The Jewish "advantage" is really an act of entrustment (Romans 3:2).

Verse 2

Nonconformist theologian Matthew Poole stated that "to the Jews were credited, or given in custody, the Holy Scriptures". Stephen, whose martyrdom Paul had witnessed before his conversion, called the scriptures the 'living oracles'.

Slanderous criticisms
In verse 8, Paul refers to slanderous accusations made by "some people" that believers say "Let's do evil that good may result".

Bishop Charles Ellicott suggests that these accusers might have been the Jews or "the Judaizing party"; Barnes says it is "doubtless" that they were Jews; the Cambridge Bible for Schools and Colleges argues that they were Paul's "inveterate adversaries in the Church".

No one is righteous (3:9–20)
Paul's statement that "both Jews and Greeks are under the power of sin" (verse 9) exposes the impossibility of either Gentile or
Jew, unaided by God, being able to become righteous (contra Romans 2:7,13, etc.; consistent with Romans 7:7–24), as supported by a compilation of citations from the Hebrew Bible (Old Testament texts) in verses 10–18 describing humanity's utter depravity or incapability of not sinning (Ecclesiastes 7:20; Psalm 5:10; 10:7; 14:1—3; 53:2—4; 36:2; 140:4; Isaiah 59:7—8; Proverbs 1:16). Only Christ can break sin's power for Jews as well as for Gentiles.

The revelation of God's righteousness (3:21–26)
This section (extending to verse 31) revisits 'the grand theme', "the righteousness of God", which is introduced in the Thanksgiving part of chapter 1. Comprising one paragraph, verses 21–26 is called by Stuhlmacher as "the heart of the letter to the Romans*, stating that "the divine character—faithful, gracious, forgiving, and merciful—has been revealed in Jesus Christ, specifically in his death as "a sacrifice for sin effective through faith"." With that actions, "altogether apart from human initiative", God has fulfilled "what God always intended to do" ("attested by the law and the prophets") "and so is proved righteous".

Verse 23

Verse 25

"Propitiation" (RSV, NAB: "expiation"): translated from the Greek word , which specifically means the lid of the Ark of the Covenant.
RSV, and NASB all translate it as 'mercy seat'.

Justification by faith – a conclusion (3:27–31)

Verse 28

The verb  is plural: "we conclude" in the King James Version and New King James Version, "we hold" in the Revised Standard Version and New Revised Standard Version, "we consider" in the New American Bible, "as we see it" in the Jerusalem Bible and New Jerusalem Bible, "we maintain" in the New American Standard Version, "we reason" or "we maintain" in the Cambridge Bible for Schools and Colleges,  in the Vulgate. Anglican bishop Charles Ellicott considers that we conclude "conveys too much the idea of an inference; the statement is rather made in the form of an assertion, we consider or we hold", whereas the 18th-century English Baptist theologian John Gill treats the phrase as a "conclusion from the premises".

See also
 Torah
 Related Bible parts: Psalm 5, Psalm 10, Psalm 14, Psalm 36, Psalm 51, Psalm 53, Psalm 140, Ecclesiastes 7, Isaiah 59

Notes

References

Bibliography

External links
 King James Bible - Wikisource
English Translation with Parallel Latin Vulgate
Online Bible at GospelHall.org (ESV, KJV, Darby, American Standard Version, Bible in Basic English)
Multiple bible versions at Bible Gateway (NKJV, NIV, NRSV etc.)

03